The Yakovlev UT-3, initially known as the AIR-17 and then Ya-17, was a twin-engine low-wing monoplane aircraft designed by Alexander Sergeyevich Yakovlev for the Soviet Air Force (VVS).

Design and development
The UT-3 was to serve as a training aircraft for pilots of multi-engine aircraft and for training air gunners, bomb aimers, navigators and radio operators. The airframe was constructed largely of wood and fabric-covered mild steel tubing. The prototype was powered by imported French Renault 6Q-01  six-cylinder inline engines but production aircraft may have used the Voronezh MV-6 (Soviet-built Bengali 6 copy).

Testing was undertaken in 1938 and the aircraft was approved for construction as the UT-3. While the prototype had been fitted with 2x  ShKAS machine guns and racks for four FAB 50 bombs, the production model was unarmed and more austere. Production was ordered in 1940 at two factories, No. 135 in Leningrad and No. 272 in Kazan. Only around thirty aircraft were built before orders were cancelled as the VVS high command decided to use multi-engine combat aircraft, modified for dual control, in place of dedicated training types.

Operational history
Despite a seemingly bright future, the UT-3 was only produced in limited numbers, due to slow development and the cessation of MV-6 and Kossov MG-31F engine production.

Variants
AIR-17 (aka Samolyet No.17, S-17, Ya-17, UT-3 or M-17) Prototype three-seat twin-engined bomber-trainer. Powered by two  Renault 6Q-01 engines driving Ratier 1363 variable pitch propellers.

UT-3 2MV-6 (3-seat) Initial production of the armed three seat bomber trainer, powered by two Voronezh MV-6 engines driving AV-3 variable-pitch propellers. Only one aircraft built, of ten ordered, due to poor performance and stability.

UT-3 2MV-6 (2-seat) Following the poor results from the 3-seat aircraft's flight tests, the aircraft was re-designed as a two-seat pilot trainer. Nine aircraft were built and sent to service units for testing, with poor results due to design faults and poor manufacturing standards. Production was transferred to GAZ-47.

UT-3 2MV-6 (2-seat GAZ-47)At GAZ-47 changes were made to address the short-comings revealed in the service tests, which were only partly successful. Only eight aircraft were built to this standard.

UT-3 'standard setter for 1941'(aka S-17A, Ya-17, UT-3 2MV-6A or UT-3M) Optimised as a conversion trainer, the instructor sat offset to starboard behind the trainee who sat offset to port, under a common canopy. The undercarriage was now fixed and power was supplied by 2x  Voronezh MV-6A engines, mounted on extended engine mounts to retain the centre of gravity in the safe zone. One aircraft built.

UT-3 with MG-31F engines A projected version powered by 2x  Kossov MG-31F 9-cylinder radial engines, (not built).

UT-3 'standard setter no.2 The standard setter no.1 fitted with twin fins and rudders and sweptback outer wing panels, (not built).

UTPB (uchebno-trenirovochnyy pikeeruyushchiy bombardirovshchik – dive bomber trainer) A projected dive bomber trainer to have been fitted with dive brakes under the wings, (not built).

Ya-19 (aka S-19, AIR-19) A civil transport derivative of the UT-3 using the wings, tail, undercarriage and engines of the UT-3 married to a new fuselage with a two-crew cockpit and cabin with sets for five passengers, (one built).

Operators

VVS

Specifications (UT-3 2MV6A)

References

Further reading
 

1930s Soviet military trainer aircraft
UT-3
Low-wing aircraft
Twin piston-engined tractor aircraft